Fritz Bucco (date of birth unknown) was a Swiss footballer who played for FC Basel as forward in the early 1920s.

Bucco joined Basel's first team for their 1920–21 season. In this season he played only one friendly match a home match in the Landhof on 8 May 1921. He scored his first goal in this same game as Basel won 4–1 against La Chaux-de-Fonds.

After playing in another test match the following season, Bucco played his domestic league debut for the club in the away game on 12 March 1922 as Basel played a 2–2 draw with Luzern. Bucco scored his first league goal for his club one week later in the home game as Basel won 2–1 against Aarau.

In his two seasons with the club Bucco played a total of five games for Basel scoring a total of two goals. Three of these games were in the Serie A and two were friendly games. He scored one goal in the domestic league and one in the test game.

References

Sources
 Rotblau: Jahrbuch Saison 2017/2018. Publisher: FC Basel Marketing AG. 
 Die ersten 125 Jahre. Publisher: Josef Zindel im Friedrich Reinhardt Verlag, Basel. 
 Verein "Basler Fussballarchiv" Homepage
(NB: Despite all efforts, the editors of these books and the authors in "Basler Fussballarchiv" have failed to be able to identify all the players, their date and place of birth or date and place of death, who played in the games during the early years of FC Basel)

FC Basel players
Swiss men's footballers
Association football forwards
Swiss Super League players